Western Bay of Plenty District is a territorial district within the Bay of Plenty Region of New Zealand. The district envelops Tauranga City by land, and includes Matakana Island, at the entrance to Tauranga Harbour.

Local government
The seat of the Western Bay of Plenty District Council is at Greerton in Tauranga City (which is a separate area that is not part of the district). The district came into being in the local government reorganisation of 1989; with minor modifications to the boundaries, it merged the old Tauranga County and Te Puke Borough. The greatest changes were in the northwest, with Waihi Beach being transferred to the district from the old Ohinemuri County, and in the vicinity of Tauranga City, where some of the hinterland, formerly in the county, was transferred to the city.

The wards (for the purposes of electing district councillors) are the following:

 Waihi Beach-Katikati Ward: (seat at Katikati)
 Waihi Beach Sub-Division
 Katikati Sub-Division
 Kaimai Ward: (seat at Ōmokoroa)
 Te Puke-Maketu Ward: (seat at Te Puke)
 Te Puke Sub-Division
 Maketu Sub-Division

Population

Western Bay of Plenty District had a population of 51,321 at the 2018 New Zealand census, an increase of 7,629 people (17.5%) since the 2013 census, and an increase of 9,495 people (22.7%) since the 2006 census. There were 18,462 households, comprising 25,647 males and 25,677 females, giving a sex ratio of 1.0 males per female. The median age was 45.2 years (compared with 37.4 years nationally), with 9,555 people (18.6%) aged under 15 years, 8,130 (15.8%) aged 15 to 29, 22,881 (44.6%) aged 30 to 64, and 10,758 (21.0%) aged 65 or older.

Ethnicities were 81.4% European/Pākehā, 19.2% Māori, 2.7% Pacific peoples, 6.5% Asian, and 1.6% other ethnicities. People may identify with more than one ethnicity.

The percentage of people born overseas was 19.2, compared with 27.1% nationally.

Although some people chose not to answer the census's question about religious affiliation, 51.1% had no religion, 33.3% were Christian, 2.0% had Māori religious beliefs, 1.0% were Hindu, 0.1% were Muslim, 0.5% were Buddhist and 4.3% had other religions.

Of those at least 15 years old, 6,735 (16.1%) people had a bachelor's or higher degree, and 7,935 (19.0%) people had no formal qualifications. The median income was $30,300, compared with $31,800 nationally. 6,438 people (15.4%) earned over $70,000 compared to 17.2% nationally. The employment status of those at least 15 was that 19,869 (47.6%) people were employed full-time, 7,083 (17.0%) were part-time, and 1,215 (2.9%) were unemployed.

References

External links